Shunyakovo (Şünäk) is a rural locality (a village) in Burayevsky Selsoviet, Burayevsky District, Bashkortostan, Russia. The population was 15 as of 2010. There is 1 street.

Geography 
Shunyakovo is located 9 km south of Burayevo (the district's administrative centre) by road. Shabayevo is the nearest rural locality.

References 

Rural localities in Burayevsky District